Kwakta is a town and a Municipal Council in Bishnupur district in the Indian state of Manipur.

Demographics
 India census, Kwakta had a population of 7958. Males constitute 50% of the population and females 50%. Kwakta has an average literacy rate of 63%, higher than the national average of 59.5%: male literacy is 71%, and female literacy is 55%. In Kwakta, 13% of the population is under 6 years of age.

References

Cities and towns in Bishnupur district
Bishnupur, Manipur